Happenstance is the debut studio album by American singer-songwriter Rachael Yamagata.  It was released on RCA Victor on June 8, 2004, in the United States, and May 16, 2005, in the United Kingdom. Three months after its release in the United States, on September 8, 2004, a limited edition including two bonus tracks was released in Japan.

The album was produced by John Alagía, at Compass Point Studios except for the songs "Paper Doll" (produced by Kevin Salem), and "Collide" (part of the Japanese release produced by Doug McBride).

Track listing

American & UK release
"Be Be Your Love"  (Rachael Yamagata and John Alagia) —4:12
"Letter Read"  (Rachael Yamagata) —3:44
"Worn Me Down"  (Rachael Yamagata) —3:42
"Paper Doll"  (Rachael Yamagata and Kevin Salem) —5:15
"I'll Find a Way"  (Rachael Yamagata) —5:14
"1963"  (Rachael Yamagata and Mark Batson) —4:02
"Under My Skin"  (Rachael Yamagata) —4:11
"Meet Me By the Water"  (Rachael Yamagata) —3:58
"Even So"  (Rachael Yamagata) —4:18
"I Want You"  (Rachael Yamagata and Dan Wilson) —2:56
"Reason Why"  (Rachael Yamagata) —5:06
"Moments with Oliver" [instrumental]  (Rachael Yamagata) —1:02
"Quiet"  (Rachael Yamagata) —6:02
"Ode To..." [unlisted track]  (Rachael Yamagata) —5:47

Japanese Limited Edition release
"Be Be Your Love" —4:12
"Worn Me Down" —3:42
"Letter Read" —3:44
"Collide" —5:02
"Paper Doll" —5:15
"Moments with Oliver" —1:02
"Quiet" —5:02
"Under My Skin" —4:11
"1963" —4:02
"Edith" —7:01
"Even So" —4:18
"Meet Me By the Water" —3:58
"I Want You" —2:56
"I'll Find a Way" —5:14
"Reason Why" —5:06
"Ode to..." —5:47

Japan 2005 Tour Sampler
Japan 2005 Tour Sampler is another Promo EP by Rachael Yamagata released by RCA in 2005.

 "Worn Me Down" (Album version from Happenstance)
 "1963" (Album version from Happenstance)
 "Be Be Your Love" (Album version from Happenstance)
 "The Reason Why" (Live version from Live at the Loft & More)
 "Be Be Your Love" (Live version from Live at the Loft & More)

Charts

Album

Singles

Release history

References

2004 albums
Rachael Yamagata albums